is a Japanese judoka. He won the gold medal in the 90 kg weight class at the 2014 Asian Games.

References

External links
 

1989 births
Asian Games gold medalists for Japan
Asian Games bronze medalists for Japan
Japanese male judoka
Asian Games medalists in judo
Judoka at the 2014 Asian Games
Living people
Medalists at the 2014 Asian Games
20th-century Japanese people
21st-century Japanese people